Arthur Walsh (June 15, 1923 – September 24, 1995) was a Canadian actor and dancer, who appeared in American films during the 1940s and 1950s. His first credited film appearance was Blonde Fever (1944). He continued to act throughout the late 1950s, making a final appearance in the film The 30 Foot Bride of Candy Rock (1959). He made a memorable guest appearance on I Love Lucy in 1953. In 1966, he appeared on an episode of The Phyllis Diller Show. He died of natural causes in 1995 in North Hollywood, California, aged 72.

Partial filmography

Stage Door Canteen (1943) - Jitterbugging Soldier (uncredited)
See Here, Private Hargrove (1944) - Private Wearing Glasses (uncredited)
Two Girls and a Sailor (1944) - Lonesome Soldier (uncredited)
Blonde Fever (1944) - Willie
Groovie Movie (1944, Short) - Himself (uncredited)
This Man's Navy (1945) - Cadet Rayshek
Main Street After Dark (1945) - Dancing Sailor (uncredited)
Anchors Aweigh (1945) - Sailor (uncredited)
Ziegfeld Follies (1945) - Telegraph Boy ('A Sweepstakes Ticket') (uncredited)
What Next, Corporal Hargrove? (1945) - Ellerton
They Were Expendable (1945) - Seaman Jones
Plantation Melodies (1945, Short)
A Letter for Evie (1946) - Bobby (uncredited)
Easy to Wed (1946) - Newspaper Office Boy (uncredited)
Courage of Lassie (1946) - Freddie Crews (uncredited)
No Leave, No Love (1946) - Nick
My Darling Clementine (1946) - Hotel Clerk (uncredited)
Sarge Goes to College (1947) - Arthur Walsh
Good News (1947) - Dancer (uncredited)
Big City (1948) - Boogie-Woogie Fan (uncredited)
On an Island with You (1948) - 2nd Assistant Director (uncredited)
You Gotta Stay Happy (1948) - Milton Goodrich
Command Decision (1948) - Photographer (uncredited)
Little Women (1949) - Lad Jo Refuses to Dance with (uncredited)
Flame of Youth (1949) - Hector
Ranger of Cherokee Strip (1949) - Will Rogers
Battleground (1949) - G.I. (uncredited)
Gunmen of Abilene (1950) - Tim Johnson
When Willie Comes Marching Home (1950) - Soldier at Dance (uncredited)
Mr. Imperium (1951) - Specialty: California Cowboy (uncredited)
Street Bandits (1951) - Arnold 'Blackie' Black
Radar Men from the Moon (1952, Short) - Motorcycle Cop [Ch. 11] (uncredited)
The Fabulous Senorita (1952) - Pete (uncredited)
The Lady Wants Mink (1953) - Motorcycle Cop (uncredited)
Three Sailors and a Girl (1953) - Sailor (uncredited)
Affair in Reno (1957) - Bellhop (uncredited)
The Last Hurrah (1958) - Frank Skeffington Jr.
Battle Flame (1959) - Nawlins
The 30 Foot Bride of Candy Rock (1959) - Lieutenant (uncredited)
The Gene Krupa Story (1959) - Minor Role (uncredited)

External links

1923 births
1995 deaths
American male film actors
Canadian male film actors
Canadian expatriate male actors in the United States
20th-century American male actors
20th-century Canadian male actors